Kalawati Saran Children's Hospital is a multi-specialty hospital in New Delhi that was founded and headed by Dr. Sheila Singh Paul, pioneer of the field of pediatrics in India. Kalawati Saran Children's Hospital is one of the biggest children hospitals in Asia and was Delhi's first independent children's hospital and not just a department. The hospital was inaugurated on 17 March 1956 by Lady Edwina Mountbatten, Countess Mountbatten of Burma. It was built from the proceeds of the property donated by Mr Raghubir Saran and Mr Raghunandan Saran of New Delhi and was named after the wife of late Mr Raghubir Saran. It has a separate department of Physical Medicine and Rehabilitation for which the initial electrical and electronic equipment was donated by the Government of the Soviet Union (USSR).

References

Pediatrics in India
Children's hospitals in India
Hospitals in Delhi
Hospitals established in 1956
1956 establishments in Delhi